is a passenger railway station located in the Takebe-chō neighborhood of Kita-ku of the city of Okayama, Okayama Prefecture, Japan. It is operated by West Japan Railway Company (JR West).

Lines

Station layout
The station consists of two ground-level opposed side platforms connected by a footbridge. The platform is narrow because the station is located along a cliff. Platform 2 is adjacent to the station building, which is little more than a waiting room. All trains normally use Platform 2 in both directions, unless trains moving in opposite directions are passing. The station is unattended.

Platforms

Adjacent stations

History
Makiyama Station opened on October 10, 1912.  With the privatization of the Japan National Railways (JNR) on April 1, 1987, the station came under the aegis of the West Japan Railway Company.

Passenger statistics
In fiscal 2019, the station was used by an average of 29 passengers daily.

Surrounding area
Makiyama Post Office
La Porte Makiyama (Reuse of Okayama Municipal Makiishi Elementary School Makiyama Branch School, which closed in 2004)

See also
List of railway stations in Japan

References

External links

 Makiyama Station Official Site

Railway stations in Okayama
Tsuyama Line
Railway stations in Japan opened in 1912